Alexander James is a platinum selling British songwriter and record producer from South London. He is known for co-writing the number one single "Bad Boys" (Alexandra Burke song) by The X Factor winner Alexandra Burke and his work with Jason Derulo, Adam Lambert, Katharine McPhee, and British girl group Girls Aloud.

James has collaborated with songwriters including J.R. Rotem, Busbee, Wayne Hector, The Invisible Men, Gordie Sampson, Toby Gad, E. Kidd Bogart and Rodney Jerkins.

Notable releases

References

External links
Universal Music Publishing Group, Alex James Discography, 2010

1976 births
Living people
British songwriters
British record producers
Musicians from London